Kerry Battersby (born 1 September 1968), also known as Kerri Battersby or Keri Agg, is an Australian gymnast. She competed in five events at the 1984 Summer Olympics.

References

External links
 
 
 
 

1968 births
Living people
Australian female artistic gymnasts
Olympic gymnasts of Australia
Gymnasts at the 1984 Summer Olympics
Place of birth missing (living people)
20th-century Australian women